Sarah Jodoin Di Maria (born 3 January 2000 in Montreal, Quebec) is a Canadian-born Italian diver, a 2020 European silver medallist in the team event.

As of 2021, she resides in Rome.

She represented her country at the 2020 Summer Olympic Games in Tokyo.

References

External links
 

2000 births
Living people
Divers from Montreal
Italian female divers
Olympic divers of Italy
Divers at the 2020 Summer Olympics
Canadian female divers
Canadian people of Italian descent